Dimitrios Kasoumis (8 February 1930 – 1996) was a Greek sports shooter. He competed in the 50 metre pistol event at the 1960 Summer Olympics.

References

External links
 

1930 births
1996 deaths
Greek male sport shooters
Olympic shooters of Greece
Shooters at the 1960 Summer Olympics
Sportspeople from Lamia (city)